This is an alphabetical list of known Hindi songs performed, sung and/or recorded by Mohammed Rafi between 1942 and 1980.  Over 5,000 of his songs are listed here. Mohammed Rafi also sang in several different languages other than Hindi such as Punjabi, Marathi etc.  Some of which are also listed here.

P 

(187)

 "Paagal Naina (Non-Filmy Solo - Unknown/Unknown) - Unknown ****"
 "Paagal Zamane Mein (Solo - R. D. Burman/Yogesh Gaud) - Mazaaq 1975"
 "Paas Aa Kar To Na Yun Sharmayiyein (Duet Asha Bhosle - Laxmikant-Pyarelal/Rajendra Krishan) - Laadla 1966"
 "Paas Aa Ke Huye Hum Door, Hum door, Yehin Tha Kismat Ko Manzoor, Yehin Tha Kismat Ko Manzoor (Duet Lata Mangeshkar - Husnlal-Bhagatram/Qamar Jalalabadi) - Meena Bazaar 1950" 
 "Paas Baitho Tabiyat Behal Jayegi, Maut Bhi Jo Aaye Woh Fasal Jayegi (Solo - C. Arjun/Indeevar) - Punar Milan 1964"
 "Paas Humarein Aayiyein, Aji Door Se Na Tadapaiyein (Bhangara/Lawani Duet Asha Bhosle - Bipin Babul/Noor Devasi) - Bus Conductor 1959"
 "Pada Tumhara Kabhi (Duet Asha Bhosle - Laxmikant Pyarelal/Asad Bhopali) - Ganga Aur Suraj 1980"
 "Pagdi Sambhal Jatta (Patriotic Solo - Prem Dhawan/Prem Dhawan) - Shaheed 1965"
 "Pagdi Sambhal Jatta (Patriotic Solo - Sardool Kwatra) - Pagdi Sambhal Jatt ****"
 "Pahle Mile The Sapno Mein Aur Aaj Samane Paya Haay Kurbaan Jaoon Tum Sang Jivan Aise Katega Jaise Dhup Sang Chhaya (Solo - Shankar-Jaikishan/Hasrat Jaipuri) - Zindagi 1964"
 "Pahli Bar Mile Hai Do Diwane (Duet Asha Bhosle - C. Arjun) - Road No. 303  1959"
 "Pahli Nazar Tere Pyar Ki O Meri Dil Mein Ootar Gayi, Jaise Ki Loa Talwar Ki O Seene Se Gujar Gayi (Duet Kamal Barot - Chitragupt) - Tel Malish Boot Polish 1961"
 "Paigaam Maut Ka Kaatil Ne (Multi Manna Dey, Krishna Kalle and Preeti Sagar - Sharda Sinha Sinha/Balkavi Bairagi) - Kshitij 1974"
 "Paijama Tang Hain Kurta Dhila (Duet Krishna Kalle - Usha Khanna/Asad Bhopali) - Simla Road 1969"
 "Painjaniyan Chhanke Ram, Bijuriya Chamak Chamak Reh Jaaye (Classical Solo - Laxmikant-Pyarelal/Majarooh Sultanpuri) - Wapas 1969"
 "Paisa Hi Rang Roop Hain (Solo - Ram Ganguly/Nazir Akbarabadi-Lalchand Bismil) - Paisa 1957"
 "Paise Ka Khel Nirala (Duet Asha Bhosle - R. D. Burman/Nida Fazil) - Biwi O Biwi 1981"
 "Paise Ka Kya Yakeen Kabhi Hai Yeh To Kabhi Nahin Paise Ka Guroor Kya Aisa Bhi Kusoor Kya Daulat Ka Suroor Kya Aisa Bhi Huzoor Kya (Solo - Laxmikant-Pyarelal/Anand Bakshi) - Suhana Safar 1970"      [Haaye Re Paisa Haye Re Pisa Haye Re Paisa Haaye ...]
 "Paise Ki Pehchan Yahan, Insaan Ki Kimat Koi Nahin, Bachke Nikal Ja Iss Basti Mein Kar Ta Mohabbat Koi Nahin 1 (Solo - Shankar-Jaikishan/Neeraj) - Pehchan 1970 and Mohammed Rafi Collection Vol. 10 ****"
 "Paise Ki Pehchan Yahan, Insaan Ki Kimat Koi Nahin, Bachke Nikal Ja Iss Basti Mein Kar Ta Mohabbat Koi Nahin 2 (Solo - Shankar-Jaikishan/Neeraj) - Pehchan 1970"
 "Pal Do Pal Ka Saath (Qawali Duet Asha Bhosle - R. D. Burman/Sahir Ludhianvi) - The Burning Train or Burning Train 1980"
 "Palkon Ke Peechhe Se Kya Tumne Keh Daala Phir Se To Farmaana (Duet Lata Mangeshkar - S. D. Burman/Majrooh Sultanpuri) - Talaash 1969"
 "Palkon Pe Bhi Chirag Jale Hain Hansi Ke Saath, Aise Bhi Kuch Mazak Huye Zindagi Ke Saath (Solo - Unknown) - Unknown ****"
 "Panchhi Gaane Lage (Solo - Ajit Merchant/Saraswati Kumar Deepak) - Indraleela 1956"
 "Panchhi Re O Panchhi, Ud Ja Re O Panchhi, Mat Chhed Tu Yeh Tarane, Ho Jaye Na Do Dil Deewane (Duet Asha Bhosle - Shankar-Jaikishan/Shailendra) - Hare Kanch Ki Chooriyan 1967"      (Birds Singing)] 
 "Pandit Ho Ya Lala Ya Gandhi Topi Wala (Duet Geeta Dutt - N. Dutta aka Datta Naik/Jan Nisar Akhtar) - Rikshawala 1960"
 "Panghat Pe Dekho Aayi Milan Ki Bela Aa Aa Aa, Thumak Thumak Raadhe Chori Chori Aayee O Ji Ji Ji Ji, Sakhiyon Se Puchhe Kite Chhupe Hain Kanhai O Ji Ji Ji Ji, Haaye Bansi Ki Dhun Sun Ke Surayi Re O Ji Ji Ji Ji, ..Man Hua Bhanwara Nahin Manaye Maane Re (Janmashtami Geeta Roy - S. D. Burman/Sahir Ludhianvi) - NauJawan 1951"
 "Paon Chhoo Le Ne Do Phoolon Ko Inaayat Hogi Inaayat Hogi Warna Hum Ko Nahin In Ko Bhi Shikayat Hogi (Duet Lata Mangeshkar - Roshan Lal/Sahir Ludhianvi) - Taj Mahal 1963 and Mohd Rafi Ghazals Vol. 2 ****"
 "Paon Mein Dori Dori Mein Ghungharu Ghungharu Ki Dhun Jhun Bole  Main Hoon Tera Tu Hain Meri Mera Man Bole Paon Mein Dori Dori Ho (Duet Asha Bhosle - Ravindra Jain/Ravindra Jain) - Chor Machaye Shor 1974"[O O O O O O .. Aa Aa ...]
 "Paon Padun Tore Shyam Brij Mein Laut Chalo (Non-filmy Solo Janmashthami - Khaiyyam/Unknown) - This Is Mohd Rafi Saab -Ghazala And Bhajans **** and Tere Bharose Nandlal 1991 and - Legends - Mohd Rafi Vol 2 **** "
 "Papee Jevria Bol Satnam Bol Satnam (Punjabi Solo Prayer - S. Mohinder/I. S. Hasanpuri) - Man Jeete Jag Jeet 1973"      [Satnam Satnam Waahe Guru ...]
 "Parbat Dera Pyar Bhara (Solo - Gandharva-Ghantasala/Shrivas) - Jhanda Ooncha Rahe Hamara 1964"
 "Parbat Ke Is Paar Parbat Ke Us Paar Goonj Uthi Chum Chum Goonj Uthi Chum Chum Chum Meri Payal Ki Jhankaar Aa Aa (Duet Lata Mangeshkar - Laxmikant-Pyarelal/Anand Bakshi) - Sargam 1979"      [Sa Re Ga Ma Pa Dha Ni Hun Hun Hun Aa Aa Aa ...]
 "Parbaton Ke Pedon Par Shaam Ka Basera Tha (Duet Suman Kalyanpur - Khayyam/Sahir Ludhianvi) - Shagoon 1964"
 "Parda Hain - Parda Hain, Parda Hain - Parda Hain, Parda Hain - Parda Hain, Parda Hain - Parda Hain, Parda Hain - Parda, Parda Hain - Parda, Parede Ke Peeche Parda-Nashi Hain, Parda-Nashi Ko Be-Parda Na Kar Doon, Ke Parda, Parda-Nashi Ko Be-Parda Na Kar Doon To Akbar Mera NAam Nahin Hain (Qawali Solo - Laxmikant-Pyarelal/Anand Bakshi) - Amar Akbar Anthony 1977 and Evergreen Mohd Rafi ****"      [Aa Aa Aa ..Shabab Pe Main Zarasi Sharab Phekoonga, Kisi Hanseen Ki Taraf Yeh Gulab Phekoonga, ...] 
 "Parda Hata De Mukhda Dikha De (Duet Asha Bhosle - Laxmikant-Pyarelal/Anand Bakshi) - Madhavi 1969"
 "Parda Hata Do (Duet Asha Bhosle - Ravi/Prem Dhawan) - Ek Phool Do Mali 1969"
 "Parda Zara Hatao (Solo - Usha Khanna/Hasrat Jaipuri) - Murder In Circus 1971"
 "Parde Mein Koi Baitha Hain (Duet Shailendra Singh - Usha Khanna/Asad Bhopali) - Dada 1978"
 "Pardesi Piya Ho Pardesi Piya (Duet Asha Bhosle - Chitragupt/Majrooh Sultanpuri) - Pardesi 1970"
 "Pardesiya Tere Desh Mein (Duet Sulakshana Pandit - Shankar-Jaikishan/Singhar) - Garam Khoon 1980"
 "Pardesiyon Se Na Ankhiyan Milana Pardesiyon Ko Hain Ik Din Jaana 1 (Solo - Kalyanji-Anandji/Anand Bakshi) - Jab Jab Phool Khile 1965 and Mohammed Rafi Collection Vol. 1 and 6 ****"      (Inspired by a Thumri of Nirmala Devi)
 "Pardesiyon Se Na Ankhiyan Milana Pardesiyon Ko Hain Ik Din Jaana 2 (Solo - Kalyanji-Anandji/Anand Bakshi) - Jab Jab Phool Khile 1965"
 "Parmatma Hain Pyare Atma Ke Andar (Prayer Solo - K. Babuji/Indeevar) - Parmatma 1978"      [Insaan Khota Koi Nahin, Khote Hote Hain Kaam, Ravan Apne Ko Badle To, Ban Sakta Hain Raam ...]
 "Parody Song (Parody Asha Bhosle - R. D. Burman/Rajendra Krishan) - Waris 1969"      [Yahoo Yahoo!! Chahe Mujhe Koi Bhoot Kahon Chahe Koi YamDoot Kahon Nakli Jadu Ne Mara Gaya Tha Wapas Aa Gaya...]
 "Parwar Digar E Alam Tera Hi Hain Sahara Tere Siwa Jahan Mein Koi Nahin Hamara (Prayer Solo - Shri Nath Tripathi/Akhtar Romani) - Hatimtai 1956"     (This song was such a hit, that it was incorporated into the Urdu Primary School Prayer Song in that era.)
 "Pasand Aa Gai Hain Ek Kafir Haseena Umar Us Ki Solah Baras Chhe Mahina (16 th Birthday Solo  - Laxmikant-Pyarelal/Anand Bakshi) - Mehboob Ki Mehndi 1971"
 "Paschim Se Nikal Kar Suraj Bhi Purab Mein (Solo - Bullo C. Rani/Gopal Singh Nepali) - Veer Rajputani 1955" 
 "Pashaner Bhangaley Ghoom By Kazi Nazrul Islam (Bangali - Unknown) - Aajo Madhuro Banshori Baaje 1981 or 2011"
 "Pasina Pasina (Solo - Ravi/Rajendra Krishan) - Nai Roshni 1967"
 "Pataa Note Karo, O Pata Note Karo Humara, O Pataa Note Karo Humara, Hum Se Aa Milna Dobara, Prem Nagar Mein Prem Sadak Pe, Sab Se Oonche Maale Par Hain, Kholi Number Gyraha (Solo - Nashad Ali/Raja Mehdi Ali Khan) - Zara Bachke 1959"      [Are ...]       (Nashad Ali also known as Shaukat Ali, Shaukat Haidari, Shaukat Dehlvi, Shaukat Husain and Shaukat Husain Haidari.)
 "Patangaa Jal Jal Mar Jaayein (Duet Asha Bhosle - Shankar-Jaikishan/Hasrat Jaipuri) - Patangaa 1971"
 "Pathar Ke Sanam, Tujhe Hum Ne, Mohabbat Ka Khuda Jana, Badi Bhool Huyi, Are Hum Ne, Kya Samajha, Kya Jana (Solo - Laxmikant-Pyarelal/Majrooh Sultanpuri) - Pathar Ke Sanam 1967"
 "Pati Ke Karan Sati Bhikaran Ban Ke (Solo - Sardar Malik/Bharat Vyas) - Naag Jyoti 1963"
 "Pativrata Seeta Mayi Ko (Prayer Solo - Shankar-Jaikishan/Shailendra) - Awaara 1951"
 "Patta Patta Buta Buta Haal Humara Jaane Hain (Duet Lata Mangeshkar - Laxmikant-Pyarela/Majrooh Sultanpuri) - Ek Nazar 1972  and Evergreen Mohd Rafi ****"
 "Pavan Chale To Utthe Nadi Mein Laher Si (Paheli Duet Asha Bhosle - S. D. Burman/Majrooh Sultanpuri) - Bambai Ka Babu 1960"
 "Payal Khul Khul Jaye Ram Mori (Duet Asha Bhosle - Ravi/Shakeel Badayuni) - Grihasthi 1963"
 "Payaliya Chhanki Ki Na (Duet Anuradha Paudawal - Laxmikant-Pyarelal/Anand Bakshi) - Do Premi 1980" 
 "Pedon ki ghani chhaon mein kahin ye dhoop guzar hi jayegi - Unknown - Non filmy" 
 "Pee Kar Sharab Khailon Ga (Solo - Naushad Ali/Rajendra Krishan) - Ganwaar 1970"
 "Pee Lee Thodi Bhang Tabiyat Huyi Malang Rang Chhane Laga Maza Aane Laga  (Duet Asha Bhosle - Laxmikant-Pyarelal/Anand Bakshi) - Insaan 1982"      [Thoomka Are Thoom Pe Thoomka ...]
 "Peete Peete Kabhi Yun (Duet Asha Bhosle - Kalyanji-Anandji/Anand Bakshi) - Bairaag 1976"
 "Pehla Pehla Pyar Hua (Solo - Jamal Sen/Shri Ram Saaz) - Manchali 1962"
 "Pehla Pehla Pyar Ka Ishara Kaho Ji Dekha Hain Kabhi, Dil Lut Ne Ka Yeh Nazaara Kaho Ji Dekha Hain Dekha Hain Kabhi Chand Ke Pehloo Mein Tara Kaho Ji Dekha Hain Kabhi Apne Seene Mein Dil Hain Hamara Kaho Ji Dekha Hain Dekha Hain Kabhi (Duet Lata Mangeshkar - Shankar-Jaikishan/Rajendra Krishan) - College Girl 1960"
 "Pehle Aayi Murgi (Solo - Shri Nath Tripathi/Prem Dhawan) - Raja 1963"
 "Pehle Paisa Phir Bhagwan Babu De Te Jana Daan, De Te Jana Atthani Yaa Chawani Babu Aana Do Aana, Pahle Paisa Phir Bhagwan Babu De Te Jana Daan, De Te Jana Atthani Yaa Chawani Babu Aana Do Aana (Solo - Hemant Kumar/Rajindra Krishan) - Miss Mary 1957"
 "Pehle To Ankh Milana (Duet Jagjeet Kaur - Khayyam/Kaifi Azmi) - Shola Aur Shabnam 1961"
 "Pehli Nazar mein Hum Ne (Multi Kishore Kumar, Asha Bhosle and Usha Mangeshkar - R. D. Burman/Sahir Ludhianvi) - The Burning Train or Burning Train 1980"
 "Pehli Nazar Tere Pyar Ki Ho Mere Dil Mein Ootur Gayi (Duet Kamal Barot - Chitragupt/Prem Dhawan) - Tel Malish Boot Polish 1961" 
 "Pehli Pehli Baar Mile Hain Do Diwane (Duet Asha Bhosle - C. Arjun/Naqsh Lyallpuri) - Road No. 303 1960"
 "Pehli Pehli Baar Mujh Ko Yey.. Kya Ho Gaya, Bolo Na Main Kaise Ye Janu Ke (Duet Asha Bhosle - Kalyanji-Anandji/Verma Malik) - Yaaron Ka Yaar 1977"
 "Pepito Dekho Shaam Dhhali Jayein (Duet Suman Kalyanpur - Chitragupt/Prem Dhawan) - Rocket Girl 1962"
 "Phagun Ka Mast Mahina Hain, Mausam Hain Albela, Itni Badi Duniya Mein Main Lachar Hoon Akela (Solo - C. Ram Chandra) - Nazrana 1949"
 "Phinjoda Bhak Bhayee ..Dil Pathar Ho (Shadi 90% Asha Bhosle and Minoo Purushottam - Sonik-Omi) - Umar Qaid 1975"
 "Phir Aane Laga Yaad, Wohi Pyar Ka Alam, Inkaar Ka Alam, Kabhi Ikraar Ka Alam, ..Pyar Ka Alam (Duet Usha Khanna - Iqbal Qureshi/Qamar Jalalabadi) - Yeh Dil Kis Ko Doon 1963"
 "Phir Milogi Khabhi Is Baat Ka Wada Kar Lo, Hum Se Ikraar Mulaqat Ka Wada Kar Lo (Duet Asha Bhosle - O. P. Nayyar/Shamshul Huda Bihari) - Yeh Raat Phir Na Aayegi 1966"
 "Phir Tere Shahar Mein Loot Ne Ko Chala Aaya Hoon Phir Wohin Ishq Tera Phir Wahin Dil Laya Hoon (Solo - O. P. Nayyar/Shewan Rizvi) - Ek Musafir Ek Hasina 1962"     [AA Aa Aa ...]
 "Phir Teri Yaad Naye Geet Sunane Aayi 1 (Solo - S. Mohinder/Raja Mehdi Ali Khan) - Bekhabar 1965"
 "Phir Tumhari Yaad Aai Ae Sanam, Hum Na Bhoolenge Tumhein Allah Kasam (Qawali Multi Manna Dey and Sadat Khan - Sajjad Hussain/Qamar Jalalabadi) - Rustom Sohrab 1963"      [Aa Aa ...]
 "Phir Wahi Shyaam (Solo - Shyam Sagar/Dev Kohli) - Pal Do Pal Ka Saath 1978"
 "Phir Woh Bhooli Si Yaad Aayi Hai Aye Gum-E-Dil Teri Duhai Hai - (Taj Mahal Solo - Sapan-Jagmohan/Shailendra) - Begana 1963 and Down Memory Lane -Mohammad Rafi ****"
 "Phir Wohi Dil Laya Hoon (Solo - O. P. Nayyar/Majrooh Sultanpuri) - Phir Wohi Dil Laya Hoon 1963 and Mohammed Rafi Collection Vol. 6 ****"      [Banda Parwar Tham Lo Jigar Ban Ke Pyar Phir Aaya Hoon Khidmad Mein Aap Ki Huzoor]
 "Phirki Wali Tu Kal Phir Aana (Solo - Laxmikant-Pyarelal/Anand Bakshi) - Raja Aur Runk 1968"
 "Phool Bagiya Ka Sari Bole (Bhojpuri Duet Asha Bhosle - Chitragupt/Anjaan) - Nautanki 1980"
 "Phool Bagiya Mein Bulbul Bole, Daal Pe Bole Kayaliya, Pyar Karo, Pyar Karo Rut Pyar Ki Aayi Re, Bhanwaron Se Kehti Hain Kaliyan, Ho Hi Ho Ho Ji Ho (Duet Lata Mangeshkar - Shri Nath Tripathi/Bharat Vyas) - Rani Rumati 1959"
 "Phool Hain Baharon Ka, Baag Hain Nazaron Ka, Aur Chand Hota Hain Sitaron Ka, Mera Tu U U Tu Hin Tu, Mauj Hain Kinaron Ki, Raat Beqararon Ki, Aur Rimjhim Sawan Ki Puharon Ki Meri Tu U U Tu Hin Tu (Duet Lata Mangeshkar - Laxmikant-Pyarelal/Anand Bakshi) - Jigri Dost 1969"
 "Phool Ka Shabaab Kya (Solo - Bappi Lahiri/Naqsh Lyallpuri-Anjaan) - Farz Ki Jung 1989"
 "Phool Khile Hain (Multi Manna Dey and Asha Bhosle - Laxmikant-Pyarelal/Rajendra Krishan) - Phool Khile Hain Gulshan Gulshan 1978"
 "Phool Ko Bhool Ke Le Baitha Khaar (Duet Geeta Roy - Hansraj Behl/Mulkraj Bhakri) - Chunariya 1948"
 "Phool Sa Chehra, Chand Si Rangat, Chaal Qayamat, Kya Kahiye, Jo Bhi Dekhe Ho Jaye Pagal Apni To Haalat Kya Kahiye (Solo - Shankar-Jaikishan/Hasrat Jaipuri) - Raat Aur Din 1967"      [Phool Sa Chehra Aa Aa Aa ...]
 "Phoolon Jaise Phoolo Phalo O Mere Laadlon - Sant Gyaneshwar"
 "Phoolon Ki Tarah Woh Hasati Thi (Solo - Bappi Lahiri/Dev Kohli) - College Girl 1978 ana A Treasure Revealed 2012"
 "Phoolon Se Dosti Hain Kaaton Se Yaari Hain Aise Mazeki Aise Maze Ki Pyre Zindagi Humari Hain (Horse-Cart Duet Asha Bhosle - Hemant Kumar/Rajendra Krishan) - Duniya Zukti Hain 1960"      [Hurra Ha ..O Ho Ha ...]
 "Phoolon Se Hain Meri Dosti, Har Kali Ke Dil Mein Rahta Hoon, Phoolon Se Hain Meri Dosti, Har Kali Ke Dil Mein Rahta Hoon, Likh Lo Mera Pata Haseeno, Baat Pate Ki Kahta Hoon, Pate Ki Kahta Hoon, Phoolon Se Hain Meri Dosti (Solo - Sonik-Omi/Varma Malik) - Heeron Ka Chor 1982"      [Suno P-P-Pa-Pa-Pa, P-P-Pa-Pa-Pa ..P-Pa ...]
 "Phoot Gaile Kismatiya (Bhojpuri Duet Asha Bhosle - Nadeem Shravan/Kulwant Jani) - Dangal (bjp) 1977"
 "Phur Se Udh Jaati Thi Bul Bul (Solo - Laxmikant-Pyarelal/Anand Bakshi) - Shaadi Ke Baad 1972"
 "Pi Lo Aaj Pi Lo (Solo - Shankar Jaikishan/Neeraj) - Patangaa 1971"
 "Pila De Magar Shart Ye Hogi Saaki (Solo - Ganesh/Asad Bhopali) - Sub Ka Ustad 1967"
 "Pind Chhod Chale Ne Posti (Punjabi Duet Bhupinder Singh - Sardul Kwatra/Manu Dilber) - 50 Glorious Years Of Punjabi Film Music Vol. 5 **** and Do Posti 1981"
 "Pinjoda Bhak Bhayi (Multi Asha bhosle and Meenu Purushottam - Sonik-Omi/Gulshan Bawra) - Umar Qaid 1975"
 "Piparaa Ke Patavaa  (Patriotic - Pandit Ravi Shankar) - GoDaan 1963"
 "Pipra Ke Patwa Sarikhe Dole Manva Ki Jiyara Maa Uthat Hilor Are Purwa Ke Jhokwa Se Aayo Re Sadesawa Ki Chal Aaj Ki (Solo - Pandit Ravi Shankar/Anjaan) - Godaan 1963"
 "Pitu Maat Sahayak Swami Sakha (Solo - Shri Nath Tripathi/Prem Dhawan) - Shiv Parvati 1962"
 "Piya Jab Se Liya Tu Ne Haathon Mein Haath (Duet Lata Mangeshkar - Nashad Ali/Indeevar) - Hathkadi 1958"      (Nashad Ali was also known as Shaukat Ali, Shaukat Haidari, Shaukat Dehlvi, Shaukat Husain and Shaukat Husain Haidari.)
 "Piya Jo Bulayein To Main Kahoon Ji (Duet Asha Bhosle - Vinod/Aziz Kashmiri) - Ek Do Teen 1953"
 "Piya Kaise Miloon Tum Se Mere Paon Padi Zanzeer (Duet Lata Mangeshkar - Sardar malik/Bharat Vyas) - Saranga 1960"      [Shaitan ..Mriglochani ..Jeena Hain Dushwar ..Sajan Yeh Mat Jaanio ..Patta Toota Dal Se ...]
 "Piya Ki Nagariya (Solo - N. Dutt aka Datta Naik/Madan Bharti) - Pujarin 1969"
 "Piya Sang Siya Chali Banwas (Solo - Usha Khanna/Bharat Vyas) - Naag Pooja 1971"
 "Please Tell Me Sheela  (Swing - Madan Mohan Kohli) - BAap Bete 1959"      [Aa Ha O Ho ..Bol Bol Bol Bol My Little Love Dil Mera Poochta Hai ...]
 "Pochh Kar Ashq, Apni Ankhon Se, Muskurao To Koi Baat Bane, Sar Jhukane Se Kuchh Nahin Hota, Sar Uthao To Koi Baat Bane (Solo - N. Dutta aka Datta Naik/Sahir Ludhianvi) - Naya Raasta 1970"
 "Pooche Jo Koi Mujhse Bahar Kaisi Hoti Hain, Naam Tera Leke Keh Doon Ke Yaar Aisi Hoti Hain (Solo - Laxmikant-Pyarelal/Anand Bakshi) - Aap Aaye Bahar Aayee 1971"
 "Poochein Jo Koi Mujh Se (Solo - Laxmikant Pyarelal/Anand Bakshi) - Aap Aaye Bahaar Aayee 1971"
 "Poochh Kar Ashq Apni Ankhon Se Muskurao To Koi Baat Bane (Solo - N. Datta/Datta Naik) - Naya Raasta 1970"
 "Poochh Le Dil Se Mere (Duet Asha Bhosle - N. Dutta aka Datta Naik/Farid Tonki) - Ek Masoom 1969"
 "Poochh Na Mujh Se Dil Ke Fasane Ishk Ki Baatein Ishk Hi Jaane (Urdu Ghazal Solo - Khaiyyaam/Jan Nisar Akhtar) - Yaadgaar Ghazalein Vol. 1 **** and Mohd. Rafi Ghazals Vol. 2 **** and This Is Mohd Rafi Saab -Ghazala And Bhajans ****"
 "Poochhiyein Na Haal Ji Palle Nahin Maal Ji (Solo - Vinod/Aziz Kashmiri) - Mukhda 1951"
 "Poochho Koi Sawal Bachho, Mujh Se Jyada Koi Na Jaane Iss Duniya Ka Haal (Multi As Children Kamal Barot, Usha Khanna and Usha Mangeshkar - Ravi/Shakeel Badayuni) - Nartaki 1963"
 "Poochho Na Yaar Kya Hua Dil Ka Qaraar Kya Hua (Duet Asha Bhosle - R. D. Burman/Majrooh Sultanpuri) - Zamaane Ko Dikhana Hain 1981"      [Hun Hun Hun ...]
 "Poochho To Naam Bhi Apna Bata Nahin Sakte, Allah Are Kamsini, Allah Are Kamsini, Kar Te Hain Door Bhi Hum Se Woh Jaa Nahin Sakte, Allah Are Kamsini, Allah Are Kamsini (Solo - Laxmikant-Pyarelal/) - Dillagi 1966"
 "Prabhu Na Bisrayein Jee (Prayer Duet Lata Mangeshkar - Husnlal-Bhagatram/Ramesh Gupta, Gulshan Jalalabadi and Qamar Jalalabadi) - Raja Harishchandra 1952" 
 "Prabhu Tere Charan Pade Jahan Jahan (Solo - - Chitragupt/Gopal Singh Nepali) - Shiv Bhakt 1955" 
 "Prabhu Tu Dayalu Krupawant Data Daya Mangto Re Tujhi Me Ananta (Marathi Prayer Solo - Shrikant Thakare/Umakant Kanekar) - Gajaleli Bhaktigeete Vol. 2 **** and Mohammed Rafi Special ****"
 "Pran Tyag Kar Tu Ne Deewani (Solo - Firoz Nizami/Pandit Phani) - Amar Raj 1946"
 "Preet Jata Ke Meet Bana Ke (Duet Lata Mangeshkar - Mohammad Shafi/Khumar BaraBanKavi) - Hulchal 1951"
 "Preet Ka Rogi Ho Ya Jogi (Solo - Anil Biswas/Rajendra Krishan) - Heer 1956"
 "Preet Ke Bandhan Mein (Duat Lata Mangeshkar - Shri Nath Tripathi/Bharat Vyas) - Kavi Kaalidas 1959"
 "Preet Ke Suhane Geet Ga (Duet Shamshad Begum - Govind Ram/M. G. Adeeb) - Jeevan Nauka 1952"
 "Preet Laga Ke Chale Gaye (Solo - Hansraj Behl/Mulkraj Bhakri) - Chakori 1949"
 "Prem Hain Kya Ek Aansoon (Solo - Laxmikant-Pyarelal/Anand Bakshi) - Prem Kahani 1975"
 "Prem Ki Naiyya Dol Rahi Hain (Solo - Mohammed Ibrahim-Azeez Khan/Unknown) - Utho Jago 1947"
 "Prem Panth Ke Dhang Nirale  (Solo - Shri Nath Tripathi/Bharat Vyas) - Sinhal Dweep Ki Sundari 1960"      [Preet Mein Dukh Hi Dukh Hain Pyare Reet Yahi Sansaar Ki ...]
 "Priya, Priya, [Whistle] Sachcha Hain Gar Pyar Mera Sanam, Honge Jahaan Tum Wahan Honge Hum, Yeh Dhadkane Bhi Agar Jaaye Thum, Jab Bhi Pukaaro Sada Denge Hum (Solo - Shankar-Jaikishan) - Jhuk Gaya Aasman 1968"
 "Puchhna Mujh Se Dil Ke Fasane (Solo - Khaiyyam/Jaan Nisar Akhtar) - Unknown ****"     (May Be Non-Film Song )
 "Puchho Na Hum Se (Solo - Frank/Kaifi Azar) - Chor Darwaza 1965"
 "Puchho To Naam Bhi Apna (Solo - Laxmikant-Pyarelal/Majrooh Sultanpuri) - Dillagi 1966"
 "Pukar Prabhu Sun Dhire Bhakton Ki (Solo - Parmathi-Ashwatham/Sant Kabir) - Ram Aur Rahim 1968"
 "Pukarta Chala Hoon Main Gali Gali Bahar Ki Bas Ek Chhao Zulf Ki Bas Ek Nigah Pyar Ki (Outdoor Solo - O. P. Nayyar/Majrooh Sultanpuri) - Mere Sanam 1965 and Mohammed Rafi Collection Vol. 4 ****"
 "Pukarti Hain Mohabbat, Qareeb Aa Jao (Duet Suman Kalyanpur - Iqbal Qureshi/Jan Nisar Akhtar) - Dastan-E-Laila Majnu 1974" 
 "Puncture Yeh Duniya (Duet Mehmood - Kalyanji-Anandji/Verma Malik) - Kangan 1972"
 "Putrahin Ko Pita Bana Kar (Solo - S. L. Merchant-Shreeram/Bharat Vyas) - Sati Renuka 1961"
 "Pyala Honthon Tak Pahuncha To, Saqi Ne Nazar Se Thok Diya, Hum PyAas Bujhanewale The, Humein Peene Se Kyun Rok Diya (Qawali Multi Naseem Chopra, Anwar and Shobha Gurtu - Shankar-Jaikishan/M. G. Hashmat) - Duniyadari 1977"      [Aa Aa Aa ..Chikna Chehra, Hontt Gulabi, Gore GAal Pe, Zulf Ude, Jo Bhi Dekhe, Nashe Mein Us Ke, Baheke Baheke Pano Uthe, Aa Aa Aa ..   Ishq Mein Tere Huye Sharabi, Bin Piye Na ShAam Kate, PyAas Ke Mare Hum Hi Tadape, Mehfil Mehfil JAam Batein, HAay Allah ...] 
 "Pyar Beqarar Hain Pyar Ki Pukar Hain Sun (Solo - Kamal Mitra/Kaifi Azmi) - Yahudi Ki Beti 1956"
 "Pyar Bina Hain Mushkil Jeena (Multi Manna Dey and Krishna Kalle - C. Arjun/Qamar Jalalabadi) - Chale Hain Sasural 1966"
 "Pyar De Bhuleke (Punjabi Duet Lata Mangeshkar - Hansraj Behl/Verma Malik) - Bemisaal Vol. 3 ****"
 "Pyar Hain Ek Nishan Kadmon Ka 1 (Solo - R. D. Burman/Anand Bakshi) - Mukti 1977"
 "Pyar Hain Ek Nishan Kadmon Ka 2 (Solo - R. D. Burman/Anand Bakshi) - Mukti 1977"
 "Pyar Ka Le Kar Udan Khatola Chala Yeh Pujari Bina Panka Jab Udi Mohabbat Dekhe Duniya Sari, Pyar Ka Lekar Udan Khatola Chala Yeh Pujari Bina Panka Jab Udi Mohabbat Dekhe Duniya Sari (Duet Sharda Sinha Sinha - Shankar-Jaikishan/Rajendra Krishan) - Tumse Achha Kaun Hai 1969"    [Pyar Ka Lekar Udan Khatola Aaya Prem Pujari ...]
 "Pyar Ka Madhur (Duet Asha Bhosle - Adi Narayan Rao/Hasrat Jaipuri) - Phoolon Ki Sej 1964"
 "Pyar Ka Mara Hoon Main Julia (Duet Manna Dey - Dilip Dholakia/Prem Dhawan) - Private Secretary 1962"
 "Pyar Ka Saaz Bhi Hain, Dil Ki Awaz Bhii Hain, Mere Geeton Mein Tum Hi Tum Ho, Mujhe Naaz Bhi Hain, Chheda Mere Dil Ne, Tarana Tere Pyar Ka, Jis Mein To Na Kho Gaya, Pura Nasha Ho Gaya (Solo - Shankar-Jaikishan/Hasrat Jaipuri) - Asli Naqli 1962"
 "Pyar Ka Samay Kam Hain Jahaan (Multi Kishore Kumar and Lata Mangeshkar - R. D. Burman/Majrooh Sultanpuri) - Raampur Ka Lakshman 1972"
 "Pyar Kar Dhaar Kar (Duet Asha Bhosle - Ravindra Jain/Ravindra Jain) - Toofan 1975"
 "Pyar Kar Pyar Kar Rama Rama (Duet Asha Bhosle - Laxmikant-Pyarelal/Anand Bakshi) - Do Premi 1980"
 "Pyar Karna Hi Padega Ik Din Tumko Hansna Hi Padega Ik Din (Solo - Firoz Nizami/Pandit Indra) - Sharbati Aankhen 1945"
 "Pyar Ke Daman Se Lipte (Duet Asha Bhosle - G. S. Kohli/Anjaan) - Char Darvesh 1964"
 "Pyar Ke Sagar Se Nikali Moti Ke Badle Ret Ab Pachhtaye Kya Huway Jab Chidiya Jhuk Gayi Khet O O O ..Ik Jhoot Hain Jis Ka Duniya Ne Rukkha Hain Mohabbat Naam (Solo - Naushad Ali/Shakeel Badayuni) - Jadoo 1951"
 "Pyar Ki Baatein Koi Na Jane (Duet Asha Bhosle - Ram Prasad/Shakeel Nomani) - Magic Carpet 1964"
 "Pyar Ki Boliyan Bolti (Duet Asha Bhosle - Roshan Lal/Majrooh Sultanpuri) -Aarti II 1962"
 "Pyar Ki Galiyon Se Woh Beta Kar Le Bistar Gol Zamana Nazuk Hain, Zamana Nazuk Hain, Baat Fateh Ki Kehta Hoon Main Dekh Bajaa Ke Dhol, Zamana Nazuk Hain, Zamana Nazuk Hain (Father To Munna Solo - Ravi/) - Devar Bhabhi 1958"      [Hazaron Hasratein Aei Si, Ke Har Hasarat Pe Dum Nikale, Bahut Nikale Tere Armaan Lekin, Phir Bhi Kum Nikale, Nikalna Khuld Se Adam Kasam Se Aaye The Lekin, Bahut Beabroo Ho Kar Tere Kuchche Se Hum Nikale ...]
 "Pyar Ki Hasaratein Khakh Mein Mil Gayi Do Kadam Chal Ke Do Hamsafar Jal Gaye (Duet Asha Bhosle - Iqbal Qureshi/Shewan Rizvi) - Kawali Ki Raat 1964"
 "Pyar Ki Kasam Hain, Na Dekh Aise Pyar Se, O O O, Tu Mera Sanam Hain Kahoongi Main Pukar Ke (ChaChaCha Duet Asha Bhosle - Usha Khanna/Majrooh Sultanpuri) - Dil Deke Dekho 1959"
 "Pyar Ki Manzil Mast Safar (Outdoor Solo - S. D. Burman/Hasrat Jaipuri) - Ziddi 1964"
 "Pyar Ki Pyas (Duet Lata Mangeshkar - Vasant Desai/Bharat Vyas) - Pyar Ki Pyas 1961"
 "Pyar Ki Raah Bahar Ki Manzil (Duet Asha Bhosle - Naushad Ali/Khumar Barabankvi) - Saaz Aur Awaz 1966"
 "Pyar Ki Raah Dikha (Solo - G. S. Kohli/Anjaan) - Lambe Haath 1960"
 "Pyar Ki Raah Dikha Duniya Ko Roke Jo Nafarat Ki Aandhi 1 (Patriotic Children - G. S. Kohli) - Lambe Haath 1960"
 "Pyar Ki Raah Dikha Duniya Ko Roke Jo Nafarat Ki Aandhi 2 (Patriotic Children - G. S. Kohli) - Lambe Haath 1960"
 "Pyar Kiya Hain (Duet Sulakshana Pandit - Sonik-Omi/Munsif) - Badla Aur Balidan 1980"
 "Pyar Kiya Hain To Pyar Nibhana (Duet Suman Kalynpur - Jimmy/Akhtar Romani) - Pyar Ki Baazi 1967"
 "Pyar Kiya He Aise (Solo - Chitragupa/Kafil Azar) - Mohammed Rafi: The Last Songs 2010"      (Planned Hindi remake of a 1962 Bengali film with the name, "Sorry Madam" by Dilip Bose was never made, because it may have been considered as bad-luck due to loss of Dilip Bose's wife and financial hardship.  The music, however, was recorded just seven months before Rafi's death.  The music was restored by Frenchman Achille Forler of a music publishing company, Deep Emotions in a joint venture with Universal Music.   Frenchman sent the tapes to Equus Studios in Belgium to restore and released the album in 11-2-2010 by Silk Road Communications with an additional Track "Teri Ada", which gives audio documentary from Dilip Bose's sons Bobby [and may be Rajesh] and Chitragupt's sons Anand-Milind.  Frenchman told Deccan Herald that he was prepared to do shirshasana for one year to have a Rafi album in his catalogue and its catalogue # is SR025 and the file is under Hindi Memorabilia. )
 "Pyar Kiya Nahi Jata, Ho Jata Hain (Duet Asha Bhosle - Nisar Bazmi/Saba Afghani) - Pyara Dushman 1955" 
 "Pyar Kiya Nahin Jata, Ho Jata Hain Mere Yaar, Pehli Pehli Na Ka, Aadha Matlab Hain Haan (Solo - Chitragupt/Rajendra Krishan) - Barkha 1959"      [Aa Aa Aa ..Hoye ...]
 "Pyar Kiye Jana Ho Pyar Kiye Jana (Duet Shamshad Begum - Shri Nath Tripathi/B. D. Mishra) - Panna 1956"
 "Pyar Koi Kam Kam Karein (Duet Asha Bhosle - Lala Asar Sattar/Farooq Qaiser) - Khiladi 1968"
 "Pyar Mein Joker Ban Gaye Hum Rim Tara Rim Tara Rum, Pyar Mein Joker Ban Gaye Hum Rim Tara Rim Tara Rum, Ab Laakh Hanse Hum Par Yeh Zamana, Ab Laakh Hanse Hum Par Yeh Zamana, Pyar Mein Joker Ban Gaye Hum Rim Tara Rim Tara Rum, Ab Laakh Hanse Hum Par Yeh Zamana, Ab Laakh Hanse Hum Par Yeh Zamana,   (Duet Asha Bhosle - Hemant Kumar/Rajendra Krishan) - Duniya Jhukti Hai 1960"      [Whistle ...] 
 "Pyar Mein Mitna (Solo - C. K. Chauhan/K. L. Pardesi) - Rachna 1983"
 "Pyar Milega Jab Na Kahin (Duet Usha Khanna - Usha Khanna/Asad Bhopali) - Woh Koi Aur Hoga 1967"
 "Pyar Mohabbat Ke Siwa Yeh Zindagi Aa Gale Laga Ja Mere Aur Chhod De Yeh Dillagi (Duet Asha Bhosle - Shankar-Jaikishan) - Pyar Mohabbat 1966"      [Hurre Hurre ...]
 "Pyar Se Dil Bhar De, Nahin Nahin, Hum Se Karam Kar De, Kabhi Nahin (Duet Asha Bhosle - Kalyanji-Anandji/Indeevar) - Kab, Kyun Aur Kahan? 1970"
 "Pyar Se Koi Dil Deta Hain (Multi Asha Bhosle and Sharda Sinha Sinha - Datta Naik/Shamshul Huda Bihari-Khalik-Aziz Kasmiri-Shad Fidayi) - Ganga 1974"
 "Pyar Sikha Doon ..Sikhla Do Na ..Aao Tumhein Main Pyar Sikha Doon, Sikhla Do Na, Prem Nagar Ki Dagar Dikhadoon, Dikhla Do Na, Dil Ki Dhadakan Kya Hoti Hain, Yeh Anjana Raaz Bataoon, Batala Do Na (Duet Lata Mangeshkar - Kalyanji-Anandji) - Upaasna 1971"
 "Pyar To Ek Din Hona Tha, Hona Tha Ho Na Tha, Ho Gaya Ho Gaya, Dil To Ek Din Kho Na Tha Kho Gaya Kho Gaya (Twist Duet Asha Bhosle - Kalyanji-Anandji/Rajendra Krishan) - Ek Shriman Ek Shrimati 1969"
 "Pyar Woh Shai Hain (Solo - Madan Mohan Kohli/Raja Mehdi Ali Khan) - Neela Akash 1965"
 "Pyara Lage Pyara (Duet Sulakshana Pandit - Sapan-Jagmohan) - Habari 1979"
 "Pyara Pyara Hain Samaa (Duet Asha Bhosle - O. P. Nayyar/Raja mehdi Ali Khan) - Kalpana 1960"
 "Pyara Safar Pyara Lage  (Duet Sulakshana Pandit - Sapan-Jagmohan/M. G. Hashmat) - Habari 1978"
 "Pyare Pyare Tere Andaz Ke Qurban (Duet Asha Bhosle - Lala Asar Sattar/Farooq Qaiser) - Watan Se Door 1968"
 "Pyari Bole Bulbul Padsan Bole Kauwa (Solo - Hemant Kumar/Shailendra) - Hum Bhi Insaan Hain 1959"

Q 

(3)

 "Qad-O-Gesoo (Urdu Ghazal Solo - Khaiyyam or Kedar Pandit, S D Burman, Anupam Shobhakar/Mirza Ghalib) - Mohd Rafi Ghazals Vol. 2 **** and Kalaam-E-Ghalib: Ghazals By Lata/Rafi ****"
 "Qawwali Ki Raat Hain (Multi Manna Dey, S. Balbir and Asha Bhosle - Iqbal Qureshi/Shewan Rizvi) - Qawali Ki Raat 1964"
 "Qayamat Hain Qayamat Hain (Duet Anuradha Paudwal - Rajesh Roshan/Anand Bakshi) - Mr. Natwarlal 1979"

R 

(129)

 "Raadhe Kaahe Tu Ne Murli Churai (Prayer Usha Mangeshkar - Rajesh Roshan) - Priyatama 1977"      [Na Na Na Na Na Jaane Na Doongi ...]
 "Raadhike Tune Bansuri ChurAayee, Bansi Churayee Kya Tere Man Aayee (Classical - Shankar-Jaikishan/Shailendra) - Beti Bete 1964"      [Aa Aa Aa ...]
 "Raah Chalti Hain Ke Rahi Chalte Hain (Children Duet Paintal - Ravindra Jain/Ravindra Jain) - Khoon Kharaba 1980"
 "Raah-E-Wafa Mein Nikle Hain (Duet Master Sonik - Hansraj Behl/Sarshar Sailani) - Kashmir 1951"
 "Raahi Mil Gayein Raahon Mein, Baatein Huyi Nigahon Mein (Solo - Usha Khanna/Majrooh Sultanpuri) - Dil Deke Dekho 1959"      [La Ra La La Hun Hun Hun La Ra La O Ho Aa Ha ...]
 "Raam Ki Leela Rang Layi Aa Ha Ha Shyaam Ne Bansi Bajai (Munni Birthday - Naushad Ali/Shakeel Badayuni) - Raam Aur Shyaam 1967"      [Aayee Hai Baharen Mite Zulmo Sitam ...]
 "Raam Krishn Ki Dharti Par (Solo - Jamal Sen/Arjun - III) - Amar Shaheed II 1960"
 "Raat Aayi Hain Jawa, Mast Sama, Hosh Kahan Hai (Duet Shamshad Begum - Bipin Babul/Hasrat Jaipuri) - Shahi Mehmaan 1955"      [Ha Ho Ho Ha ...]
 "Raat Andheri Gayi (Duet Asha Bhosle - Shivram Krishna/Asad Bhopali) - Rangeela Raja 1960"
 "Raat Bhar Ka Hain Mahima Andhera 2 (Solo - O. P. Nayyar) - Sone Ki Chidiya 1958"      [Maut Kabhi Bhi Mil Sakti Hai ...]
 "Raat Bhar Ka Hain Mehman Andhera (Duet Asha Bhosle - O. P. Nayyar/Sahir Ludhianvi) - Sone Ki Chidiya 1958"
 "Raat Bhar Ka Hain Mehman Andhera 1 (Duet Asha Bhosle - O. P. Nayyar) - Sone Ki Chidiya 1958 "
 "Raat Bhi Hai Kuch Bheegi Bheegi Chand Bhi Hai Kuch Madham-Madham (Duet Lata Mangeshkar - JaiDev) - Mujhe Jeene Do 1963"
 "Raat Hone Lagi Hain Jawan (Duet Hemlata - Ravindra Jain/Ravindra Jain) - Khoon Kharaba 1980"
 "Raat Jhoomti Dil Ko Chumati (Duet Suman Kalyanpur - S. Mohinder/Raja Mehdi Ali Khan) - Reporter Raju 1962"
 "Raat Kaali Jugnu Chamke (Duet Shamshad Begum - Hansraj Behl/Prem Dhawan) - Mud Mud Ke Na Dekh 1960"
 "Raat Ke Humsafar Thak Ke Ghar Ko Chale Jhoomati Aa Rahin Hain Subah Pyar Ki Dekh Kar Samne Roop Ki Roshani Phir Luti Jaa Rahi Hain Subah Pyar Ki (Duet Asha Bhosle - Shankar-Jaikishan/Shailendra) - An Evening In Paris 1967"
 "Raat Rangeeli Mast Nazare (Duet Lata Mangeshkar - Naushad Ali/Shakeel Badayuni) - Dulari 1949"
 "Raat Sard Sard Hai Chaand Dard Dard Hai Mere Dil Mein Pyar Ka Halka Halka Dard Hai (Swing Telephone Asha Bhosle - O. P. Nayyar) - Jaali Note 1960"
 "Raat Suhani Jaag Rahin Hain Dhire Dhire Chupke Chupke Chori Chori Ho ..Prem Kahani Jaag Rahi Hain (Duet Suma Kalyanpur - Laxmikant-Pyarelal/Anand Bakshi) - Jigri Dost 1969"      [O O O O O O ...]
 "Raat Yun Dil Mein (Duet Asha Bhosle - Shankar-Jaikishan/Faiz Ahmed Faiz) - Janwar 1965"
 "Raat Zulm Ki Kat Jaiegi (Solo - Jamal Sen/Arjun-III) - Amar Shaheed II 1960"
 "Raaton Ka Raja Hoon Main (Solo - R. D. Burman/Majrooh Sultanpuri) - Raaton Ka Raja 1970"
 "Raaton Ki Siyaahi Hain (Solo - Usha Khanna/Akhtar Romani) - Raat Andheri Thi 1967"
 "Raaz-E-Dil Unse Chhupaya Na Gaya (Solo - Ravi/Asad Bhopali) - Apna Banake Dekho 1962"
 "Raaz Ki Baat Keh Doon To Jaan-E-Mehfil Mein, Jaan-E-Mehfil Mein Phir Kya Ho, ..Raaz Khulne Ka Tum Pahele O O Raaz Khulne Ka Tum Pahele Zara Anjaam Soch Lo, Ishaaron Ko Agar Sumujho Raaz Ko Raaz Rehne Do (Duet Qawali Asha Bhosle - Sonik-Omi/Verma Malik) - Dharma 1973"      [Yeh Huzoor Yeh Mehfil ..Arjaana Andaaz Hain ..[Samujhune Wale Hun Sumujh Lo] Iss Mein Bhi Ik Raaz Hain ...] 
 "Rab Na Kare  (Punjabi Duet Shamshad Begum - Unknown/Verma Malik) - Punjabi Classico Vol. 4 (Remix Album) ****" 
 "Rabba Ve Teriyan Be Par Vaahian (Punjabi Solo - Unknown/Naqsh Lyallpuri) - Bemisaal Vol. 2 and Bemisaal - Mohd. Rafi 2005"      [Dharti Sahil ...]
 "Rachi Jyotiwalon Mata Teri Jai Jai (Duet Narendra Chanchal - Laxmikant-Pyarelal) - Aasha or Asha 1980"
 "Radha Ji Ke Kunwar Kanhaiya Ho O Mere Naiyan Ka Kaun Khevayya O Teri Naiya Ke Ram Khevayya (Janmashthami Asha Bhosle - Chitragupt/Gopal Singh Nepali) - Tulsidas 1954"      [AA Aa Aa ...] 
 "Radheshyam Radheshyam (Janmashthami Prayer Solo - Ramnath/Sartaj Rahmani) - Aadmi I 1957" 
 "Radhike Tu Ne Bansari Churayi (Janmashthami Solo - Shankar-Jaikishan/Shailendra) - Beti Bete 1964"
 "Raghupati Raghav Raja Ram (Multi Prayer Nitin Mukesh and Anuradha Paudwal - Rajesh Roshan/Amit Khanna) - Unees Bees 1980"
 "Raghupati Raghav Ramchandra Ki Amar Kahani Hain 1 (Prayer - S. Tripathi) - Sati NaagKanya 1956"
 "Raha Gardishon Mein Hardam (Solo - Ravi/Shakeel Badayuni) - Do Badan 1966 and Mohammed Rafi Collection Vol. 2 and 8 ****"
 "Raham Kabhi To Farmao, Mao Mao Meri Laila, Oonche Sooron Mein Mat Gao Gao, Bhui Chhaila (Duet Geeta Dutt - S. D. Burman/Sahir Ludhianvi) - Society 1955"
 "Rahe To Kaise Rahe (Solo - Rasheed Attre/Nakshab Jarchvi) - Room No. 9 (Nine)  1946"
 "Rahega Jahan Mein Tera Naam (Multi Talat Mahmood and Manna Dey  - Naushad Ali/Khumar Barabankvi) - Love and God 1986"
 "Rahi Manwa Dukh Ki Chinta Kyun Satati Hai (Solo - Laxmikant-Pyarelal/Majrooh Sultanpuri) - Dosti 1964 and Mohammed Rafi Collection Vol. 4 *****"      [Dukh Ho Ya Sukh Ke Jaye To Dukh Na Hoy ...]
 "Rahoge Kab Tak Hum Se Door (Solo - Vistas Ardeshir Balsara/Prahlad Sharma) - Wohi Ladki 1967"
 "Rahoon Kaise Main Tumko Nihare Bina O O O Re Mera Man hi Na Mane Tumhare Bina (Solo - Chitragupt/Gopal Singh Nepali) - Tulsidas 1954"
 "Raj Kapoor Ki Neeli Ankhein (Duet Hemlata - Laxmikant-Pyarelal/Anand Bakshi) - Maa Aur Mamta 1970"
 "Raja Beta Bada Ho Kar Jayega School (Father-To-Munna Solo - C. Ramchandra/Rajendra Krishan) - Insaniyat 1955" 
 "Raja Ka Haathi Le Le (Duet Asha Bhosle - Madan Mohan Kohli/Rajendra Krishan) - Mastana 1954"
 "Raja Mere Dil Ke Raja (Duet Asha Bhosle - Sonik-omi/Verma Malik) - Ranga Aur Raja 1977"
 "Rajaji Tum Meri Kahani Kya Jano (Duet Shamshad Begum - Ghulam Mohammad/Shakeel Badayuni) - Hazaar Raatein 1953"
 "Rajaji Zara Samjho Payal Ki Boli (Duet Asha Bhosle - Chitragupt/Gopal Singh Nepali) - Sati Madalsa 1955"
 "Rajeshwari O Parmeshwari O Bhagyeshwari O Yogeshwari, Aey Agar Hain Chahat Humarein Hotho - Humarein Aankhon Ki, To Kuch Dinon Tak, Abhi Tapsya Karo Pujariji, O Rajeshwari O Parmeshwari O Bhagyeshwari O Yogeshwari (Duet Asha Bhosle - R. D. Burman/Majrooh Sultanpuri) - Dil Ka Raja 1972"      [Badi Hain Shaurat Tumhare Hotho - Tumhare Aankhon Ki, Kabhi Meri Bhi Murad Puri Karona Deviji, O ...]
 "Rajguru Ne Jhansi (Solo - Vasant Desai/Pandit Radheshyam) - Jhansi Ki Rani 1953"
 "Rajkaj Se Kya Lena Jab Man (Solo - Chitragupt/Bharat Vyas) - Lakshmi Pooja 1957"
 "Raju Ka Hain Ek Khwab Raju Raja Raaja Saab Raaj Hain Na Taaj Hain Phir Bhi Main Hoon Raaja Saab 1 (Solo - Kalyanji-Anandji/Anand Bakshi) - Raja Saab 1969"
 "Raju Ka Tha Ek Khwab Raju Raja Raaja Saab ..Raaj Na Tha Taaj Tha 2 (Solo - Kalyanji Aanadji) - Raaja Saab 1969"      [Jin Ki Kismat Mein Kaante, Woh Khwab Na Dekhein, Kaliyon Ke Kaliyan Mehlon Ki Raunat Aur Kaante Raahi Galiyon Ke ...]
 "Rakhi Dhaagon Ka Tyohar (Solo - Ravi/Rajendra Krishan) - Rakhi 1962"
 "Rakhna Dil Mein Dil Ki Baat (Duet Sabita Banerjee - Vinod/Deena Nath Madhok) - Garma Garam 1957"
 "Ram Aayohya Chhod Chalein (Solo - T. G. Lingappa/Sarswati Kumar Deepak) - Ramayan 1960"
 "Ram Janare Roja Galo (Aasamese Multi Bhupen Hazarikaand Unknown Female - Bhupen Hazarika/Bhupen Hazarika) - Loti Ghoti ****"
 "Ram Kare Allah Kare, Teri Meri Dosti, Bani Rahein, Aage Aage Tum Dono, Peeche Peeche Hum, Hum Ko Nahin Hain, Koi Duniya Ka Gham, Ruk Jaye, Ruk Jaye, Koi Hanse Koi Gaaye, Mehfil Saji Rahein (Multi Friendship Amit Kumar, Benny and Lata Mangeshkar - Rajesh Roshan/Anand Bakshi) - Aap Ke Deewane 1980"      [Peetidara Be-in-to ..Ho Ho Ho Ae Hey ..Ae Are ...Ram Kare, Allah Kare, Teri Meri Dosti, Bani Rahein, Are ...]
 "Ram Kare Phir Ho Humura Milanva, Ram Kare Phir Ho Humura Milanva (Solo - Pandit RatanDeep HemRaaj) - Insan Aur Insaan 1985"      [O O O O O O Gori Lakhon Janam Se Do Tere Bandan Ki Uljhi Hain Hum Se ...]
 "Ram Ki Mahima Nyari Re Manwa Kahin To Chanda Jagmag Chamke (Prayer Solo - Allah Rakha Qureshi/Sarshar Sailani) - Khandan 1955"
 "Ram Naam Japna Paraya Maal Apna (Solo - Adi Narayana Rao/Bharat Vyas) - Suvarna Sundari II 1958"
 "Ram Ram Japna Paraya Maal Apna (Solo - Hemant Kumar/Kaifi Azmi) - Do Dil 1965"
 "Ram Tu Sab Ka Rakhwala, Jab Jab Bhi Yeh Man Ghabraya, Tu Ne Aa Ke Sambhala (Prayer Solo - Laxmikant-Pyarelal/Aand Bakshi) - Chhota Bhai 1966"
 "Ramaiya VastaVaiya, Ramaiya VastaVaiya (Duet Lata Mangeshkar - Shankar-Jaikishan/Shailendra) - Shree 420 1955" 
 "Ramchandra Ki Amar Kahani Hain (Prayer Solo - Shri Nath Tripathi/Saraswatikumar Deepak) - Sati Naagkanya 1956" 
 "Ramji Ki Nikli Sawari Ramji Ki Leela Hai Nyari (Solo - Laxmikant-Pyarelal/Anand Bakshi) - Sargam 1979"      [O O O O O O Sar Pe Mukut Saje Mukh Pe Ujala ...]
 "Ramzan Ki Barkat ...Karta Hai Ek Raavi Dilsoz Yeh Bayan (Solo - A. R. Qureshi/Shewan Rizvi) - Alam Ara I 1956"
 "Rang Aur Noor Ki Baraat Kise Pesh Karoon (Solo - Madan Mohan Kohli/Sahir Ludhianvi) - Ghazal 1964 and Mohammed Rafi Collection Vol. 7 ****"
 "Rang Barasao Aaya Baad Baras Ke Holi Ka Tyohaar (Holi Duet Asha Bhosle - Sonik-Omi/Verma Malik) - Bhookh 1978"
 "Rang Basanti Ang Basanti (Duet Lata Mangeshkar - Laxmikant-Pyarelal/Anand Bakshi) - Raja Aur Runk 1968"
 "Rang Bhari Holi Aayi Rang Bhari Holi, Hoye Rang Bhari Holi Aayi Rang Bhari Holi, Ho Rang Bhari Holi Aayi Rang Bhari Holi (Janmashthami Duet Shamshad Begum - Chitragupt/Bharat Vyas) - Hamara Ghar 1950"      [Hoye ...]
 "Rang Bhi Uda Uda Hain (Duet Asha Bhosle - Chand Pardesi/Farooq Qaiser) - Ban Maanush 1979"
 "Rang Do Sabhi Ko Ek Rang Mein (Holi Multi Manna Dey and Suman Kalyanpur - Chitragupt/Prem Dhawan) - Biradari 1966"
 "Rang Jama Ke Jayenge (Multi Kishore Kumar, Asha Bhosle and Usha Mangeshkar - Laxmikant-Pyarelal/Anand Bakshi) - Naseeb 1981"
 "Rang Mastana (Punjabi Duet Suman Kalyanpur or Minoo Purshottam - Sardul Kwatra/Rajesh Malik) - Jatta Aai Visakhi Vol. 1 **** and Yamla Jatt 1976"      [Lak Patla Te ...]
 "Rang Rageela Mausam Leke Chala Ik Dulhan (Solo - Kalyanji-Anandji) - Ji Chahta Hai 1964"      [Yaan Kaa ...]
 "Rang Rang Ke Phool Khile Mohe Bhaye Koi Rang Na ...Ab Aan Milo Sajna (Duet Lata Mangeshkar - Laxmikant-Pyarelal) - Aan Milo Sajna 1970"      [O O O O O Aa Aa Aa ...]
 "Rang Rang Ki Chunari Pyari Yeh Phulwari (Duet Asha Bhosle - Vasant Desai/Hasrat Jaipuri) - Jhanak Jhanak Payal Baaje 1955"
 "Rang Rangeeli Botal Ka Dekh Lo Jadu, Are Rang Rangili Botal Ka Dekh Lo Jadu, Kala Banega Gora, Gora Banega Chhora, Chhora Banega Gora Gora (Solo - Dattaram/Gulshan Bawra) - Shriman Satyawadi 1960"
 "Rangat Teri Surat Si kisi Mein Nahin Nahin, Khooshboo Tere Badan Si Kisi Mein Nahin Nahin, Rangat Teri Surat Si kisi Mein Nahin Nahin, Khooshboo Tere Badan Si Kisi Mein Nahin Nahin, Rangat Teri Surat Si kisi Mein Nahin Nahin, Khooshboo Tere Badan Si Kisi Mein Nahin Nahin (Duet Lata Mangeshkar - Shankar-Jaikishan/Hasrat Jaipuri) - Tumse Achha Kaun Hai 1969"
 "Rani Nacho Chamak Cham (Duet Kishore Kumar - Shankar-Jaikishan/Majrooh Sultanpuri) - Love In Bombay 1975"
 "Ranjha Jaan Ke Sharaabi Banna (Duet Dilraj Kaur - Sonik-Omi/Saraswati Kumar Deepak) - Do Sholay 1977"
 "Raqqasa Mera Naam (Duet Asha Bhosle - R. D. Burman/Anand Bakshi) - The Great Gambler 1979"
 "Rassa Sayung Eh, Rasa Sayang Sayang Eh, O Lihat Non Jauh, Rasa Sayang Sayang Eh (Duet Lata Mangeshkar - Shankar-Jaikishan/Hasrat Jaipuri) - Singapore 1960"         [O ...]
 "Raste Mein Do Anjane, Aise Mile Diwane, Rahete Nahin Begane, Yeh Pyaar Nahin To Kya Hain, Raaste Mein Do Anjaane, Aise Mile Diwane, Rahete Nahin Begane, Yeh Pyaar Nahin To Kya Hain, Raaste Mein Do Anjaane (Duet Lata Mangeshkar - Madan Mohan Kohli/Majrooh Sultanpuri) - Akeli Mat Jaiyo 1963" 
 "Raste Mein Ek Haseen (Duet Asha Bhosle - O. P. Nayyar/Shewan Rizvi) - Basant 1960"
 "Raste Mein Kisi Ne Rang Dali (Holi Duet Shamshad Begum - Laxmikant Pyrelal/Anand Bakshi) - Daku Mangal Singh 1966"
 "Raste Mein Tere Kab Se Hain Khade (Duet Lata Mangeshkar - Chitragupt/Majrooh Sultanpuri) - Opera House 1961"
 "Ratan Hain Do Anmol Humarein (Duet Madhubala Zaveri - Husnlal-Bhagatram/Pandit Radheshyam) - Krishna Sudhama 1957"
 "Ratnare Matware Rasware Kajrare Nainwa Tihare Jadu Moh Pe Dale Gori Jadu Moh Pe Dale (and) Manhari Tanhari Raswari Achchi Pyari Bansari Tihari Jadu Moh Pe Dale (Janmashthami Duet S. Balbir - N. Dutta aka Datta Naik/Pyare Lal Santoshi) - Holiday In Bombay 1963"  
 "Re Mama Re Ae (Father To Munni Duet Sushama Shreshtha - Shankar-Jaikishan/Hasrat Jaipuri) - Andaz II 1971"      [Sun Lo Sunata Hoon Tum Ko Kahani Rutho Na Hum Se O Gudiyon Ki Rani Re Mama Re Mama ...]
 "Re Murakh Kiss Baat Par (Solo -  Chitragupt/Ramesh Chandra Pandey) - Bhakth Puraan 1952"
 "Rehmat Ka Ujala Chhaya Allah Ne Yeh Farmaya Utho Yeh Momino Mahe Ramzan Aaya (Prayer  - Jitin Shyam) - Abu Kaliya 1990"      [Ghaflat Mein Sone Walo Rab Ne Tumhein Puakara Uth Kar Zara To Dekho Khudrat Ka Yeh Nazara ...]
 "Rehne Do (Duet Asha Bhosle - Kalyanji-Anandji/Rajendra Krishan) - Rakhwala 1971"
 "Rekha O Rekha Jab Se Tumhein Dekha, Khana Peena Sona Dushwaar Ho Gaya, Main Adami Tha Kaam Ka Beqaar Ho Gaya (Solo - R. D. Burman/Ramesh Pant) - Adhikar II 1971"
 "Resham Ki Dori Haaye Resham Ki Dori Khan Jayi Ho Nindiya Chori Chori (Duet Lata Mangeshkar - Laxmikant-Pyarelal/Anand Bakshi) - Saajan 1969"
 "Reshma Jawan Ho Gayi, Teer Kaman Ho Gayi  (Solo - Laxmikant-Pyarelal/Anand Bakshi) - Mome Ki Gudiya 1972"      [Lad-ki Punjabi Di, Mauj Janab Di, Le Ke Angadayiyan, Pankh Di Gulab Di, Teer Kaman Ho Gayi ...]
 "Reyi Aagiponee (Telugu P. Susheela - C. RamChandran) - Akbar Saleem Anarkali ****"
 "Rik Rik Tik Tik, Boom Boom Tik, Tere Mere Do Dil, Ho Gaye Ik, Dil Mein Mere, Kar Raha Hain, Kaun Aaj Picnic (Duet Asha Bhosle - O. P. Nayyar/Qamar Jalalabadi) - Do Ustad 1959" (Rafi Sings for Raj Kapoor) 
 "Rikshe Pe Mere Tum Aa Baithe, Ab Mera Hunar Dekho (Horse-Cart Asha Bhosle - Shankar-Jaikishan/Shailendra) - Dil Tera Diwana 1962"[(Horse Sound) ...]
 "Rim Jhim Ke Geet Sawan Gaye Haaye Bhigee Bhigee Raaton Mein (Duet Lata Mangeshkar - Laxmikant-Pyarelal/Anand Bakshi) - Anjaana 1969"
 "Rim Jhim Ke Tarane Leke Aayi Barsaat (Duet Geeta Dutt - S. D. Burman/Shailendra) - Kala Bazar 1960"
 "Ro Ro Ke Yaad Karein (Duet Asha Bhosle - Madan Mohan Kohli/Rajendra Krishan) - Mastana 1954" 
 "Roka Kai Baar Main Ne Dil Ki Umang Ko Kya Karoon Main Apni Nigahon Ki Pasand Ko O Jaane Jaan Tu Hi Mere Pyar Ka Jahan Hain Ho O O O Aa Aa Aa (Duet Asha Bhosle - O. P. Nayyar/Majrooh Sultanpuri) - Mere Sanam 1965"      [Ho O O O Aa Aa Aa Ha ...]
 "Roko Manao Who Chala (Duet Meena Patki - Ganesh/Naqsh Lyallpuri) - Badnaam 1975"
 "Rome Ki Wadiyon Se Do Dil (Solo - Laxmikant Pyarelal/Anand Bakshi) - Spy In Rome 1968"
 "Rona Hain To Ro Chupke Chupke, Aansoon Na Baha, Awaaz Na Kar (Solo - C. Ramchandra/Arzoo Lakhnavi-Shamshul Huda Bihari, Asad Bhopali-Saraswati Kumar Deepak) - Duniya 1949"
 "Rona Tera Ghadi Ghadi (Solo - Chitragupt/Kaifi Azmi) - Hamara Adhikar 1970"
 "Roodade Gham-E-Ulfat Un Se (Verse Solo - S. D. Burman/Sahir Ludhianvi) - Pyaasa 1957"
 "Rookhi Sookhi, Main Khaloongi (Duet Hamida Banu - H. P. Das/Deena Nath Madhok) - Insaaf 1946"
 "Roop Ki Dhoop To Dhal Ke Rahegi (Solo - JaiDev/Hasrat Jaipuri) - Jiyo Aur Jeene Do 1969"      [Urr-rr-rr Aha Shabbas Mere Bachche ...]
 "Roop Ki Rani Dekh Phool Woh Kali Se Lipta Jaaye Itna To Samajha De Mujh Ko Iss Ka Matalab Kya Hain ..Phool Ki Niyat Bholi Bhali Kali Samajh Na Payee Tu Ne Mera Haath Jo Pakada Iss Ka Matlab Kya Hain (Duet Asha Bhosle - Sonik-Omi) - Sazaa 1972"      [O O O O O O ...]
 "Rooth Ke Jaane Wali Sun (Solo - Usha Khanna/Asad Bhopali) - Johar In Bombay 1967"
 "Roshan Sa Ek Sitara (Solo - S. Qureshi/Shewan Rizvi) - Arab Ka Sitara I 1946"
 "Rote Hain Naina Gham Ke Maare ..Rang Layi Re Bahar (Duet Shamshad Begum - Ghulam Mohammed/Shakeel Badayuni) - Amber 1952" (Rafi sings for Raj Kapoor)      [Chhum Chakaare, Chhum Chakaare ..Alar Yaamaa Chhum Chakaare ...]
 "Rote Rote Do Do Bhai Sajaye Bahena ..Main Pandit Tu Pathan 2 (Duet Manna Dey - Sonik-Omi) - Pandit Aur Pathan 1977"
 "Roye Avadhpurwasi (Solo - Vasant Desai/Bharat Vyas) - Bharat Milap 1965"
 "Ruk Ja Tere Haath Bandhe Hai Karmon Ki Janjeer Mein ..Kaisa Hai Naseeb Tera (Solo - Bappi Lahiri) - Paapi 1977"
 "Ruk Jao Are Jane Walo Haaye ..Dil Tod Ke Jana Thik Nahin (Qawali Amit Kumar, Bhupinder Singh and Aarti Mukherjee - Sapan-Jagmohan) - Pehredaar 1979"
 "Ruk Ruk Meri Raani (Duet Asha Bhosle - Kalyanji-Anandji/Verma Malik) - Chaalu Mera Naam 1977"
 "Ruk Ruk Ruk, Kahan Chali Deewani, Koi Rokay, Okay ..Wada Kar, Ab Na Karega Hum Se, Tu Dhokay, Okay (Duet Asha Bhosle - O. P. Nayyar/Qamar Jalalabadi) - Do Ustad 1959"  (Rafi Sings for Raj Kapoor)
 "Rukh Rukh Chamke (Solo - Ravi/Majrooh Sultanpuri) - Pehli Raat 1959" 
 "Rukh Se Parda To Hata Zara Nazarein To Mila O Mere Dilruba (Solo - Bipin Babul/Anjum Jaipuri) - Shahi Mehmaan 1955"
 "Rukhsana Rukhsana Dekho Ji (Duet Asha Bhosle - Dattaram Wadkar/Farooq Qaiser) - Beqasoor 1969"
 "Rula Rula Ke Pehli Aayi Aur Mili Yeh Pagar (Duet Shamshad Begum - Ghulam Mohammad/Raja Mehdi Ali Khan) - Guzara 1954"
 "Rum Jhum Ke Bajao Bansari Murari (Janmashthami Duet Krishnarao Chonkar - Shankar-Jaikishan/Shailendra) - Pooja 1954"
 "Rupaiyya Jahan Hain Wahan Hain Roop Roop Jahan Hain Wahan Hain Rupaiya (Duet Asha Bhosle - Usha Khanna/Pyare Lal Santoshi) - Roop Rupaiya 1968"
 "Rus Ke Toon Chali (Solo - Mohinder Ghoraguli/Unknown) - Bemisaal - Mohd. Rafi 2005"
 "Rut Beqarar Hain, Sham-E-Bahar Hain, Tu Zara Paas Aa Main Tujhe Dil Ki Dhadakan Sunaoon Aa Aa Aa ..Ruth (Solo - Laxmikant Pyrelal/Anand Bakshi) - Maa Aur Mamta 1970"
 "Rut Hain Milan Ki Saathi Mere Aa Re (Duet Lata Mangeshkar - R. D. Burman/Majrooh Sultanpuri) - Mela 1971 and Mohammed Rafi Collection Vol. 9 ****"
 "Rut Mastani O Samane Hain Rani, O Yahin Yahin Hain Jawani, Jawani, Pyar Ki Kahani O Aankhon Ki Jabani, O Yahin Yahin Hain Jawani, Jawani, Rut Mastani O Samane Hain Rani, o Yahin Yahin Hain Jawani, Jawani (Swing Duet Chand Bala - Madan Mohan Kohli/Qamar Jalalabadi) - Anjam IV 1952"
 "Rutt Bhangara Paoun Di Aayi Ke Ambiyan Nu Boor Pai Giya (Punjabi Duet Shamshad Begum - S. Mohinder/Anand Bakshi) - Jatta Aai Visakhi Vol. 1 **** and Pardesi Dhola ****"

See also 
 List of songs recorded by Mohammed Rafi
 Recorded songs (A)
 Recorded songs (B-C)
 Recorded songs (D-F)
 Recorded songs (G)
 Recorded songs (H-I)
 Recorded songs (J)
 Recorded songs (K)
 Recorded songs (L)
 Recorded songs (M)
 Recorded songs (N)
 Recorded songs (O)
 Recorded songs (S)
 Recorded songs (T)
 Recorded songs (U-Z)

P
Rafi, Mohammed